Nhlanhla Mgaga (born 3 April 1996) is a South African soccer player who plays as a forward for South African Premier Division side Stellenbosch.

Club career
After playing for Tshakhuma Tsha Madzivhandila in the National First Division, he joined Baroka on a three-year contract in January 2020. He scored his first goal for the club on 24 October 2020; a long-range finish off the post in a 2–1 victory over Maritzburg United.

References

1996 births
Living people
South African soccer players
Association football forwards
Tshakhuma Tsha Madzivhandila F.C. players
Baroka F.C. players
Stellenbosch F.C. players
South African Premier Division players
National First Division players